HMS Ithuriel was a  flotilla leader of the British Royal Navy. Originally to have been named Gabriel, the name was changed before her launch. The ship was built by Cammell Laird at Birkenhead, being launched on 8 March 1916 and entering service in August that year. Ithuriel served with the Grand Fleet during the First World War, leading both a destroyer flotilla and a submarine flotilla. She survived the war, before being sold for scrap on 8 November 1921.

Construction and design
In November 1914, as part of the Emergency War Programme of shipbuilding, the British Admiralty ordered three s (i.e. large destroyers intended to lead flotillas of smaller destroyers in action) from the Birkenhead shipyard Cammell Laird.  The second of these three ships, HMS Ithuriel (originally to be named Gabriel) was laid down on 14 January 1915 and was launched on 8 March 1916. The construction of the three Marksman-class ships by Cammell Laird was problematical, with the ships suffering machinery problems and construction delays, with the Admiralty complaining to Lairds that "better workmanship and supervision" were needed for Ithurial and Gabriel, which were 8 months behind programme. Ithuriel was commissioned on 2 August 1916.

The design displacement was  normal and  full load. Four funnels were fitted. The ship's crew was 104 officers and men.

Ithuriel was armed with four QF  Mk IV guns mounted on the ships centreline, with two 2-pounder (40-mm) "pom-pom" anti-aircraft guns and four 21 inch (533 mm) torpedo tubes.

Service
On commissioning, Ithuriel joined the 14th Destroyer Flotilla, serving as one of two leaders for the flotilla (the other being the  ), with normal duties including escorting the ships of the Grand Fleet.  From 15 June 1917 the destroyers and submarines of the Grand Fleet took part in Operation BB,  a large scale operation against German submarines, with 53 destroyers and leaders together with 17 submarines deployed on offensive patrols on the transit route for the Germans from the North Sea and around the Orkney and Shetland Islands to the Western Approaches. Ithuriel led eight destroyers of the 14th Flotilla on patrol to the west of Shetland. Heavy seas made the 14th Flotilla's patrol duties difficult, with it being forced to take shelter in St Magnus Bay on 22 June. Only one submarine was sighted by the ships of the 14th Flotilla during the operation, on 23 June, when  sighted and unsuccessfully attacked a submarine (possibly  or ). Overall, 61 sightings were made of German submarines were made by the destroyers and submarines of the Grand Fleet until the operation ended on 24 June, of which 12 resulted in attacks on the submarines, but no submarines were sunk or damaged.  In October 1917, the Grand Fleet carried out another large-scale anti-submarine operation, in which destroyers and submarines were to be used to drive German U-boats that were returning to port from operations and passing to the east of the Dogger Bank into a large (several miles long) array of mine nets. Ithuriel took part in this operation, and again was forced to take shelter with her flotilla by heavy seas, this time in Aberdeen and Peterhead on 4 October, with the weather making it impossible for the ships to patrol. The operation lasted for 10 days, and British Intelligence believed that three U-boats were probably sunk in the operation. However, the submarines in question were almost certainly lost in other mine-fields.

In October 1917, Ithuriel left the 14th Destroyer Flotilla, joining the 13th Submarine Flotilla, still part of the Grand Fleet, consisting of K-class submarines, fast, steam-powered submarines intended to operate with the fleet. Despite the night being very dark, with occasional patches of fog, the ships were running without lights. When K14 altered course to avoid a number of minesweepers ahead or her, her rudder jammed and she was rammed by K22. The two disabled submarines were then overtaken by the heavier units of the fleet, and K22 was rammed by the battlecruiser . Despite the damage, both submarines remained afloat. On hearing distress signals from the two submarines, Commander E. Leir aboard Ithuriel decided to turn the Flotilla back to go to the assistance of K14 and K22. This  put the flotilla on a collision course with the rest of the fleet, including the 12th Submarine Flotilla. On meeting the fleet, Ithuriel had to turn to avoid the battlecruiser , which took the flotilla directly into the path of the 12th Flotilla. Fearless collided with K17, which sank, then K4, following Fearless, pulled out of line and stopped to avoid hitting K17 and Fearless, and was herself hit by K6, which cut K4 in two and K7. Two submarines had been sunk with 103 killed.

Ithuriel remained as leader of the 13th Submarine Flotilla through the end of the war, and remained when the Flotilla was renamed the 1st Submarine Flotilla in April 1919. She was relieved by the light cruiser  in October 1919, and after a short period at Rosyth, was sent to Portsmouth, being reduced to care and maintenance status on 1 December 1919. By February 1921, Ithuriel had been transferred to the disposal list, and was sold to the Slough Trading Company on 8 November that year for £2,402. She left Portsmouth for scrapping in Germany on 22 March 1923.

Pennant numbers

Notes

Citations

References
 
 
 
 
 
 
 
 
 
 
www.battleships-cruisers.co.uk - RN Destroyers before 1900

 

Marksman-class flotilla leaders
World War I destroyers of the United Kingdom
Ships built on the River Mersey
1916 ships